Karma (Hindi:कर्मा) is a 1986 Indian Hindi-language action thriller film directed by Subhash Ghai and featuring an ensemble cast including Dilip Kumar, Nutan, Jackie Shroff, Anil Kapoor, Naseeruddin Shah, Sridevi, Poonam Dhillon, Satyanarayana Kaikala and Anupam Kher. The film reunites Subhash Ghai and Dilip Kumar after the success of their last film together Vidhaata (1982). The film also marked the first time Dilip Kumar was paired with veteran actress Nutan. It was the top grossing Indian film of 1986 and the eleventh highest-grossing Bollywood film of the decade.

Plot
Rana Vishwa Pratap Singh, an ex-high ranking police officer is in charge of a jail that successfully reforms criminals.
He is informed that 50 year old Dr. Michael Dang, the head of a major terrorist organisation who is captured, and he is held in his prison due to its remote location. Dang assaults a jail warden during an argument. Vishwa slaps Dang, which is highly insulting in Indian culture. Dang vows revenge on him.

While Vishwa is away, Dang's army free him.  They set about destroying the prison and killing Vishwa's family who live nearby. However, his wife is spared. After a period of mourning, Vishwa embarks on a mission to bring Dang's organisation to justice. The mission is approved by Indian government, and Vishwa successfully recruits Baiju Thakur, Johnny/Gyaneshwar, and an ex-terrorist Khairuddin Chishti.

Under the disguise of a forest ranger, Vishwa sets up bases around the Indian border near where they believe Dang's compound is located. Vishwa, Baiju, Johnny and Chishti form a strong bond during their training, and Baiju and Johnny fall in love with Radha and Tulsi, respectively. Chishti pleads with Vishwa to let Baiju and Johnny leave as he believes they have been reformed. Vishwa is unhappy.

As far as Vishwa is concerned their only motive was to complete the mission. The terrorists shoot him while he protects Baiju, Johnny and Chishti who are locked in a nearby building. Vishwa is hospitalized.  The three soldiers are distraught and realize they need to complete the mission for Singh.   They then receive intelligence on the exact location of Dr Dang's compound which they successfully infiltrate. With the help of  hostages (who are Indian army soldiers) who have been held captive by the terrorists,  they set about destroying the compound and killing the terrorists. It soon becomes apparent that the destruction of the heavily guarded munitions center is the only way the terrorists organisation can be defeated.   Khairuddin hatches a plan that involves driving a truck filled with explosives into the heart of the building.  Baiju and Johnny argue that the plan is too dangerous and they would all be killed in the process. However Khairuddin wants to sacrifice himself so that his friends can enjoy their newfound freedom. Baiju and Johnny are forcibly removed off the truck by Khairuddin who then goes on to destroy the munitions centrer at the cost of his life.  Johnny and Baiju return to the main compound and kill the remaining terrorists bringing the battle to its conclusion. Singh, having made a swift recovery, joins the battle and kills Dr. Dang thus completing the mission.

The two surviving soldiers are awarded  bravery medals and a posthumous award is granted to Khairuddin. 
Singh and the two soldiers form a long lasting friendship.

Cast

Soundtrack
Lyrics: Anand Bakshi

References

External links 

1986 films
Films directed by Subhash Ghai
Films scored by Laxmikant–Pyarelal
1980s Hindi-language films